The discography of American recording artist, songwriter and record producer Ronald Isley consists of three studio albums, four singles as a primary artist and six singles as a featured artist.

Studio albums

Singles

As featured artist

Other charted songs

Guest appearances

References

Discographies of American artists
Soul music discographies